Darka Rudbar (also Romanized as Darkā Rūdbār) is a village in Rastupey Rural District, in the Central District of Savadkuh County, Mazandaran Province, Iran. At the 2006 census, its population was 176, in 46 families.

References 

Populated places in Savadkuh County